Hunter Amon Sallis (born March 26, 2003) is an American college basketball player for the Gonzaga Bulldogs of the West Coast Conference (WCC).

High school career
Sallis did not start on his middle school basketball team but earned a spot on the varsity team as a freshman at Millard North High School in Omaha, Nebraska. He was nicknamed "Bambi" due to his lack of coordination at the time. As a senior, Sallis averaged 22.2 points, 4.6 rebounds and 3.8 assists per game, leading Millard North to its first Class A state title in 2021. He finished with 1,819 career points, the third-most in Class A history, behind only Andre Woolridge and Erick Strickland. He was named to the rosters for the McDonald's All-American Game, Jordan Brand Classic and Nike Hoop Summit.

Recruiting
Sallis was rated a five-star recruit by ESPN and 247Sports, and a four-star recruit by Rivals. He was the first five-star basketball recruit in Nebraska history. On March 26, 2021, he committed to playing college basketball for Gonzaga over offers from North Carolina and Creighton. He became the highest-ranked recruit in program history until Chet Holmgren committed a month later.

Career statistics

College

|-
| style="text-align:left;"| 2021–22
| style="text-align:left;"| Gonzaga
| 32 || 0 || 13.6 || .564 || .263 || .708 || 2.0 || .6 || .6 || .2 || 4.3

Personal life
Sallis' mother, Jessica Haynes, led Omaha Central High School to two Class A state basketball titles at played for San Diego State at the college level. Haynes' cousins include basketball players James Harden and Ron Boone. Hunter is the brother of celebrity hairstylist, Tokyo Stylez.

References

External links
Gonzaga Bulldogs bio
USA Basketball bio

2003 births
Living people
American men's basketball players
Basketball players from Nebraska
Gonzaga Bulldogs men's basketball players
McDonald's High School All-Americans
Point guards
Sportspeople from Omaha, Nebraska